The former Province of Western Finland in Finland was divided into seven regions, 34 districts and 192 municipalities.

Regions
Southern Ostrobothnia (Etelä-Pohjanmaa/ Södra Österbotten)
Ostrobothnia (Pohjanmaa/ Österbotten)
Pirkanmaa (Pirkanmaa/ Birkaland)
Satakunta (Satakunta/ Satakunda)
Central Ostrobothnia (Keski-Pohjanmaa/ Mellersta Österbotten)
Central Finland (Keski-Suomi/ Mellersta Finland) 
Southwest Finland (Varsinais-Suomi/ Egentliga Finland)

Southern Ostrobothnia

South-Eastern Bothnia
Isojoki
Jurva
Karijoki
Kauhajoki
Teuva
Northern Seinänaapurit District
Ilmajoki
Nurmo
Seinäjoki
Ylistaro
Southern Seinänaapurit District
Jalasjärvi
Kurikka
Peräseinäjoki
Kuusiokunnat District
Alavus
Kuortane
Lehtimäki
Soini
Töysä
Ähtäri
Härmänmaa District
Alahärmä
Kauhava
Lapua
Ylihärmä
Järviseutu District
Alajärvi
Evijärvi
Kortesjärvi
Lappajärvi
Vimpeli

Ostrobothnia Region

Kyrönmaa District
Isokyrö
Laihia
Vähäkyrö
Vaasa District
Korsnäs
Malax (Maalahti)
Korsholm (Mustasaari)
Oravais (Oravainen)
Vaasa (Vasa)
Vörå-Maxmo (Vöyri-Maksamaa)
South-Eastern Bothnia Coastal District
Kaskinen (Kaskö)
Kristinestad (Kristiinankaupunki)
Närpes (Närpiö)
Jakobstad District
Kronoby (Kruunupyy)
Larsmo (Luoto)
Jakobstad (Jakobstad)
Pedersöre (Pedersören kunta)
Nykarleby (Uusikaarlepyy)

Pirkanmaa Region

North Western Pirkanmaa
Hämeenkyrö
Ikaalinen
Kihniö
Parkano
South-Eastern Pirkanmaa
Kuhmalahti
Pälkäne
Southern Pirkanmaa
Akaa
Kylmäkoski
Urjala
Valkeakoski
Tampere District
Kangasala
Lempäälä
Nokia
Pirkkala
Tampere
Vesilahti
Ylöjärvi
South-Western Pirkanmaa
Mouhijärvi
Punkalaidun
Vammala
Äetsä
Upper Pirkanmaa
Juupajoki
Kuru
Mänttä
Orivesi
Ruovesi
Vilppula
Virrat

Satakunta Region

Rauma District
Eura
Eurajoki
Kiukainen
Lappi
Rauma (Raumo)
South-Eastern Satakunta
Huittinen
Kokemäki
Köyliö
Säkylä
Vampula
Pori District
Harjavalta
Luvia
Nakkila
Noormarkku
Pomarkku
Pori (Björneborg)
Ulvila
Northern Satakunta
Honkajoki
Jämijärvi
Kankaanpää
Karvia
Kiikoinen
Lavia
Merikarvia
Siikainen

Central Ostrobothnia Region

Kaustinen District
Halsua
Kaustinen (Kaustby)
Lestijärvi
Perho
Toholampi
Ullava
Veteli
Kokkola District
Himanka
Kannus
Kokkola (Karleby)
Kälviä
Lohtaja

Central Finland Region

Jyväskylä District
Jyväskylä
Jyväskylän maalaiskunta
Laukaa
Muurame
Uurainen
South-Eastern Middle Finland
Hankasalmi
Joutsa
Leivonmäki
Luhanka
Toivakka
Keuruu District
Keuruu
Multia
Petäjävesi
Jämsä District
Jämsä
Jämsänkoski
Korpilahti
Kuhmoinen
Äänekoski District
Konnevesi
Äänekoski
Saarijärvi District
Kannonkoski
Karstula
Kivijärvi
Kyyjärvi
Pylkönmäki
Saarijärvi
Viitasaari District
Kinnula
Pihtipudas
Viitasaari

Southwest Finland Region

Åboland-Turunmaa
Dragsfjärd
Houtskär (Houtskari)
Iniö
Kimito (Kemiö)
Korpo (Korppoo)
Nagu (Nauvo)
Pargas (Parainen)
Västanfjärd
Salo District
Halikko
Kiikala
Kisko
Kuusjoki
Muurla
Perniö
Pertteli
Salo
Somero
Suomusjärvi
Särkisalo
Turku District
Askainen
Kaarina
Lemu
Lieto
Masku
Merimasku
Naantali
Nousiainen
Paimio
Piikkiö
Raisio
Rusko
Rymättylä
Sauvo
Turku (Åbo)
Vahto
Velkua
Vakka-Suomi
Kustavi
Laitila
Mietoinen
Mynämäki
Pyhäranta
Taivassalo
Uusikaupunki (Nystad)
Vehmaa
Loimaa District
Alastaro
Aura
Koski Tl
Loimaa
Marttila
Mellilä
Oripää
Pöytyä
Tarvasjoki
Yläne

See also
Municipalities of Southern Ostrobothnia
Municipalities of Ostrobothnia
Municipalities of Pirkanmaa
Municipalities of Satakunta
Municipalities of Central Ostrobothnia
Municipalities of Central Finland
Municipalities of Finland Proper

Western Finland Province